The Zabeel Classic is a Group One Thoroughbred horse race run at weight-for-age over a distance of 2000 metres at Ellerslie Racecourse in Auckland, New Zealand. It is held on Boxing Day, a raceday steeped in tradition that frequently attracts in excess of 20,000 Aucklanders to the famous course.

The Zabeel Classic is named in honour of Zabeel, son of Sir Tristram and four-time New Zealand champion sire. The race was formerly known as the Auckland Classic, Oaks Stud Classic and the Japan Racing Association Classic.

List of winners

+ The race was moved from January to December in 2005.

Ellerslie Boxing day meeting

On this day, as well as the Zabeel Classic, Ellerslie holds 9 other races including: 

 the Uncle Remus Stakes - 1400m 3YO set weight plus penalties $80,000 (2021).
 the Eight Carat Classic - Group 2, 1600m 3YO fillies set weight $120,000 (2021).
 the Hallmark Stud Handicap - 1200m Open $80,000 (2021).
 the Stella Artois 1500 Championship Final - special conditions $90,000 (2021).

All 10 races at the 2021 meeting had stakes of $60,000 or more.

See also

 Auckland Cup
  Bonecrusher New Zealand Stakes
  New Zealand International/Herbie Dyke Stakes
 New Zealand Derby
 Captain Cook Stakes
 Thorndon Mile
 Thoroughbred racing in New Zealand

References

 N.Z. Thoroughbred Racing Inc.
 http://www.racenet.com.au
 http://www.nzracing.co.nz
 http://www.tab.co.nz
 http://www.racebase.co.nz
 The Great Decade of New Zealand racing 1970-1980. Glengarry, Jack. William Collins Publishers Ltd, Wellington, New Zealand.
 New Zealand Thoroughbred Racing Annual 2018 (47th edition). Dennis Ryan, Editor, Racing Media NZ Limited, Auckland, New Zealand.
 New Zealand Thoroughbred Racing Annual 2017 (46th edition). Dennis Ryan, Editor, Racing Media NZ Limited, Auckland, New Zealand.
 New Zealand Thoroughbred Racing Annual 2008 (37th edition). Bradford, David, Editor.  Bradford Publishing Limited, Paeroa, New Zealand.
 New Zealand Thoroughbred Racing Annual 2005 (34th edition). Bradford, David, Editor.  Bradford Publishing Limited, Paeroa, New Zealand.
 New Zealand Thoroughbred Racing Annual 2004 (33rd edition). Bradford, David, Editor.  Bradford Publishing Limited, Paeroa, New Zealand.
 New Zealand Thoroughbred Racing Annual 2000 (29th edition). Bradford, David, Editor.  Bradford Publishing Limited, Auckland, New Zealand.
 New Zealand Thoroughbred Racing Annual 1997  (26th edition). Dillon, Mike, Editor. Mike Dillon's Racing Enterprises Ltd, Auckland, New Zealand.
 New Zealand Thoroughbred Racing Annual 1995 (24th edition). Dillon, Mike, Editor. Mike Dillon's Racing Enterprises Ltd, Auckland, New Zealand.
 New Zealand Thoroughbred Racing Annual 1994 (23rd edition). Dillon, Mike, Editor. Meadowset Publishing, Auckland, New Zealand.
 New Zealand Thoroughbred Racing Annual 1991  (20th edition). Dillon, Mike, Editor. Moa Publications, Auckland, New Zealand.
 New Zealand Thoroughbred Racing Annual 1987 (16th edition). Dillon, Mike, Editor. Moa Publications, Auckland, New Zealand.
 New Zealand Thoroughbred Racing Annual 1985 (Fourteenth edition). Costello, John, Editor. Moa Publications, Auckland, New Zealand.
 New Zealand Thoroughbred Racing Annual 1984 (Thirteenth edition). Costello, John, Editor. Moa Publications, Auckland, New Zealand.
 New Zealand Thoroughbred Racing Annual 1982 (Eleventh edition). Costello, John, Editor. Moa Publications, Auckland, New Zealand.
 New Zealand Thoroughbred Racing Annual 1981 (Tenth edition). Costello, John, Editor. Moa Publications, Auckland, New Zealand.
 New Zealand Thoroughbred Racing Annual 1980 (Ninth edition). Costello, John, Editor. Moa Publications, Auckland, New Zealand.
 New Zealand Thoroughbred Racing Annual 1979 (Eighth edition).Costello, John, Editor. Moa Publications, Auckland, New Zealand.
 New Zealand Thoroughbred Racing Annual 1978 (Seventh edition).Costello, John, Editor. Moa Publications, Auckland, New Zealand.
 New Zealand Thoroughbred Racing Annual 1976. Costello, John, Editor. Moa Publications, Auckland.

Horse races in New Zealand
Recurring events established in 1985
Sport in Auckland
1985 establishments in New Zealand